Hand Sown ... Home Grown is the debut solo studio album by American singer Linda Ronstadt, released in March 1969 through Capitol Records. Produced by Chip Douglas of the Turtles, the album saw Ronstadt take a decisive turn away from the folk music of The Stone Poneys toward country and rock. Among others, Hand Sown... features covers of songs by Bob Dylan, Randy Newman, and Fred Neil, and a song written by fellow Stone Poney Kenny Edwards, who would go on to perform in her band through the 1970s.

The album was a commercial failure and did not register on the Billboard album chart. It had sold less than 10,000 copies before her next album release. One single release from the album appeared on Billboard magazine's Hot 100 Pop Singles chart belatedly in 1971, after the release of Ronstadt's follow-up album, Silk Purse. Edwards' "The Long Way Around" was the B-side to a single-only release of "(She's A) Very Lovely Woman." The latter song was never subsequently included on an album and was not released on CD until 2009. The double-sided single peaked at #70 in 1971. Both songs made the Cash Box singles chart as well.

Despite lack of chart success, Hand Sown... helped Ronstadt gain exposure on television variety specials and in live performances, including a June 1969 appearance on The Johnny Cash Show where she performed "Only Mama That'll Walk the Line" nearly a year before the song's originator, Waylon Jennings performed his version on the same series. Of particular note is her performance of one of Hand Sown'''s songs, a cover of the country standard "Only Daddy That'll Walk the Line," renamed "[ Only Mama...]," on October 3, 1970, at the Big Sur Folk Festival in Monterey, California.Hand Sown ... Home Grown features an early version of "Silver Threads and Golden Needles," a cover of a 1962 hit by the Springfields. Ronstadt would record the song again for the 1973 Gold-certified album Don't Cry Now'', a single release of which would reach the Top 20 of Billboard's Hot Country Songs chart in early 1974. The album features an array of backing musicians including Clarence White of The Byrds, Bernie Leadon (later a founding member of the Eagles), Red Rhodes, and Larry Knechtel.

Track listing
On the original LP, side one was called "Hand Sown" and side two was called "Home Grown" as indicated.

Personnel 
 Linda Ronstadt – vocals, finger cymbals 
 Ken Edwards – acoustic guitar
 Pete Childs – acoustic guitar
 Bob Kimmel – acoustic guitar 
 Cyrus Faryar – acoustic guitar, bouzouki
 John T. Forsha – acoustic guitar, electric guitar
 Jimmy Bond – bass 
 Billy Mundi – drums
 Clarence White - electric guitar
 Red Rhodes - pedal steel guitar

Production 
 Nick Venet – producer
 Hugh Davies – engineer
 Pete Abbott – assistant engineer
Ed Caraeff - photography
 Jerry Hopkins – liner notes

References

1969 debut albums
Linda Ronstadt albums
Capitol Records albums
Albums produced by Chip Douglas